Christopher Gavin Scott (born 7 June 2002) is a German professional footballer who plays as an attacking midfielder for Belgian First Division A club Antwerp.

Career
Scott made his Bundesliga debut for Bayern Munich in a 1–1 draw with Union Berlin on 10 April 2021.

On 28 June 2022, Scott was transferred to Belgian First Division A club Royal Antwerp on a four-year deal until 2026, for a reported €1,400,000 fee.

Personal life
Born in Germany, Scott is of Ghanaian descent. He is a youth international for Ghana.

Career statistics

Club

References

External links
DFB Profile

2002 births
Living people
German footballers
Germany youth international footballers
German sportspeople of Ghanaian descent
Association football midfielders
Bayer 04 Leverkusen players
FC Bayern Munich II players
FC Bayern Munich footballers
Royal Antwerp F.C. players
Bundesliga players
3. Liga players
Regionalliga players
Belgian Pro League players
German expatriate footballers
Expatriate footballers in Belgium
German expatriate sportspeople in Belgium